Runaway is a 2001 Hong Kong crime comedy film directed by Dante Lam and starring Nick Cheung, Anthony Wong, Ruby Wong and Samuel Pang. It follows the antics of two inept triad bosses on the run following a series of mishaps.

Plot
Dan (Nick Cheung) is a clever minded triad punk. One time on a run for fun, he plays a trick on a rival triad leader Ray (Anthony Wong), causing him to lose the opportunity of winning millions of dollars. Dan also embezzled cash from his gang and his boss, Kwan (Joe Lee) sends his henchmen to capture him. Dan escapes to Phuket Island, Thailand with his sworn brother, King (Samuel Pang), where they meet two attractive ladies. King falls in love with an innocent tattoo artist (Anya Wu), while Dan becomes entangled with the mysterious and unique Ching (Ruby Wong). At this time, Ray also arrives in Phuket in order to pursue his ideal girlfriend, Ching. Dan discovers Ching's ulterior to stay with Ray and comes in an agreement with Ching to seek benefits from Ray. At this point, Kwan's assassins also arrive in Phuket, ready to silence Dan and Ray.

Cast
 Nick Cheung as Dan
 Anthony Wong as Ray
 Ruby Wong as Ching 
 Samuel Pang as King
 Ken Lo as Tai
 Joe Lee as Boss Kwan
 Anya Wu as Tattoo girl / Assassin
 Sunny Luk as Dan's gangster
 Chan Kei-hop as Mr. Chan
 Chan Tsui-ting as Mao-mao
 Gary Mak as Brother Jiu
 Lau Ho-leung as Tour guide
 Vivian Wong as Reporter
 Tony Cheung as Chef
 Annie Wong as Tai's mother

External links
 
 HK Cinemagic entry

2001 films
2000s crime comedy films
Hong Kong crime comedy films
Hong Kong comedy films
Triad films
2000s Cantonese-language films
Films directed by Dante Lam
Films set in Hong Kong
Films shot in Hong Kong
Films set in Thailand
Films shot in Thailand
2001 comedy films
2000s Hong Kong films